Little Eaton railway station was a railway station which  served the village of Little Eaton in Derbyshire, England. It was opened in 1856 by the Midland Railway on its Ripley branch from Little Eaton Junction (approximately 3 miles north of Derby)  to Ripley.

It was the first station on leaving the main line at Little Eaton Junction and approximately a quarter of a mile away.

Immediately before the Duffield Road level crossing was the Derby Canal Wharf where the Little Eaton Gangway also terminated and at that point a goods yard was provided. The line was double to that point but from then on was largely single.

The station had a single platform on the down side and there was a short spur serving Dowdings paper mill.

There was a second level crossing immediately after the station, and longer trains could easily span both of them. The two signal  boxes were Little Eaton Station next to the Duffield Road, and Little Eaton Village. The former has been preserved and is in private ownership in Staffordshire.

In the Grouping of all lines (into four main companies) in 1923 the station  became part of the London, Midland and Scottish Railway .

Passenger services finished in 1930, though the station handled goods until 1965. The paper mill sidings remained in use for a little while afterwards and the line itself remained open to Denby for coal traffic until the late twentieth century.

Practically nothing is now left of the station apart from the track and the remnants of the platform.  The station site has been redeveloped with new private housing.

Stationmasters

Charles Locker ca. 1860 - 1881
Edward Sharpe 1881 - 1902
R. Dugdale 1902 - 1906
R. Haynes 1906 - 1914 (formerly station master at Tonge and Breedon, afterwards station master at Farnsfield)
F.C. Robinson 1914 - 1922 (afterwards station master at Saxby)
Herbert E. Wooster 1922 - 1938 (formerly station master at Edwalton)
A. Harrison from 1938 (formerly station master at Idridghay)
C.D. Gower ca. 1949

References

Disused railway stations in Derbyshire
Former Midland Railway stations
Railway stations in Great Britain opened in 1856
Railway stations in Great Britain closed in 1930
Borough of Erewash